The Tokaido Shinkansen stabbings is a murder case that occurred on June 9, 2018 in the train of the Tokaido Shinkansen that was running in Kanagawa Prefecture, Japan.

Overview 
On the night of June 9, 2018, Ichiro Kojima (小島 一朗), who was 22 years old at the time, attacked passengers with a billhook on the Tokaido Shinkansen train that was running in Kanagawa Prefecture. He killed one and seriously injured two people.

Kojima, the criminal, was arrested by the police and subsequently charged with murder and other charges. "I wanted to go to jail. It was a hassle to think for myself and live. I thought it would be easier to live within the rules set by others, so I aimed for life imprisonment." he said.  Kojima was sentenced to life imprisonment in December 2019 and was confirmed in January 2020.  He expressed joy in being sentenced to life imprisonment he wanted.

In response to this incident, the companies that operate the Shinkansen worked to strengthen the safety measures for the Shinkansen.

See also 
 2021 Tokyo stabbings (disambiguation)

References 

June 2018 events in Japan
Murder in Japan
2018 in rail transport
Stabbing attacks in 2018
Tōkaidō Shinkansen
Mass stabbings in Japan